Victória Guapiassu Lobo Chamorro (born 10 July 1996) is a female water polo goalkeeper of Brazil.

She was part of the Brazilian team at the water polo world championships 2013 in Barcelona, 2015 in Kazan and 2019 in Budapest. She has over 100 caps for Brazil.
Chamorro won two bronze medals in the Panamerican Games 2015 in Toronto and 2019 in Lima. 
She participated at the 2016 Summer Olympics.
She played for University of Southern California from 2014-2018. She made her Bachelor in social sciences and economics. 
Since 2019 she plays in Germany for Wasserfreunde Spandau 04. 
She is allied with the German waterpolo nationalteam player Ben Reibel. He is playing for Wasserfreunde Spandau, too.

See also
 List of women's Olympic water polo tournament goalkeepers

References

1996 births
Living people
Place of birth missing (living people)
Brazilian female water polo players
Water polo goalkeepers
Olympic water polo players of Brazil
Water polo players at the 2016 Summer Olympics
Pan American Games medalists in water polo
Pan American Games bronze medalists for Brazil
Water polo players at the 2015 Pan American Games
Water polo players at the 2019 Pan American Games
Medalists at the 2015 Pan American Games
Medalists at the 2019 Pan American Games
21st-century Brazilian women
20th-century Brazilian women